Vice Admiral Elenjikal Chandy Kuruvila, PVSM, AVSM was a former Flag officer in the Indian Navy. He was the Fleet commander of the Western Fleet during the Indo-Pakistani War of 1971, for which he was awarded the Param Vishisht Seva Medal. He later led the Southern Naval Area and then served as the Chairman and Managing Director of Mazagon Dock Limited.

Early life and education
Kuruvila was born on 4 October 1922 in a wealthy Syrian Christian family to Elenjikal John Kuruvila, a businessman who set up the Annamalais Timber Trust Company, and Anna Kuruvila (née Chandy). He was born in Bangalore and grew up in Bangalore and Thrissur. He attended the St. Thomas College, Thrissur and later the Madras Christian College (MCC). At MCC, he met and befriended K. M. Mathew, later the editor-in-chief of the Malayalam-language daily, Malayala Manorama.

Kuruvila applied for a commission in the Royal Indian Naval Volunteer Reserve (RINVR). Successful in the written test and the interview, he was commissioned in the RINVR on his 20th birthday, 4 October 1942 as an Acting Sub-lieutenant in the Executive Branch.

Naval career

Early career
As a temporary Sub-Lieutenant, Kuruvila served on the auxiliary patrol vessel HMIS Sitakhoond. On 13 May 1944, he was promoted to the rank of Lieutenant. He later served on the   when it was deployed in the Bay of Bengal. In 1945, he participated in Operation Dracula, the amphibious assault on Burma. After the war, he was granted a permanent commission in the Royal Indian Navy (RIN). He was selected to attend the Long Gunnery course in 1947, thus becoming the first Long 'G' officer post-Independence, and embarked for the United Kingdom. He attended the Royal Naval College, Greenwich where he and Sir Henry Leach, who rose to become the First Sea Lord and Chief of the Naval Staff of the Royal Navy were course-mates. Kuruvila quickly became popular with the course and with the locals.

Post-Independence
He later served on the R-class destroyer  and was appointed the first lieutenant of the ship. The Ranjit was commanded by Commander S M Nanda. Kuruvila was promoted to acting lieutenant-commander (paid) on 31 December 1950.

In early 1952, Princess Elizabeth and Prince Philip, Duke of Edinburgh set out for a tour of Australia and New Zealand by way of Kenya. The Rajput and the Ranjit were nominated to escort  from Mombasa to Australia. With the death of King George VI, this was cancelled. To commemorate the Coronation of Elizabeth II, a massive Coronation review of the fleet was held at Portsmouth. The flagship INS Delhi, destroyer INS Ranjit and frigate  represented India at the review. A naval armada consisting of ships from the Indian Navy, Royal Navy, Royal Australian Navy and the Royal New Zealand Navy sailed from Portsmouth to Gibraltar. The fleet carried out exercises along the way and was under the command of Lord Mountbatten. The Ranjit under Nanda acquitted itself well during these exercises. Subsequently, the Indian ships continued conducting exercises with the Mediterranean Fleet. They sailed from Gibraltar to Malta, the Greek islands and to Istanbul.

In 1953, he was selected to attend the Defence Services Staff College, Wellington. In January 1956, Kuruvila was appointed to the staff at the High Commission of India in London in the rank of Commander. The High Commissioner of India to the United Kingdom during his stint was Vijaya Lakshmi Pandit. Kuruvila was the liaison officer at the Admiralty during the acquisition of these ships. He visited the ASW ships periodically and provided help and advice to the commissioning commanding officers. He was promoted substantive commander on 30 June 1957.

The Delhi was commanded by Captain Nilakanta Krishnan. Krishnan and Kuruvila made a great team and led the ship admirably. In March 1960, the Delhi, under Krishnan, was part of the fleet in the Joint Commonwealth exercises which was the largest till then, with the Royal Navy, Royal Australian Navy, Royal Ceylon Navy, Pakistan Navy, Royal New Zealand Navy and Royal Malaysian Navy participating.

In 1960, Kuruvila was appointed Commanding Officer of the cadet training ship, the Black Swan-class sloop INS Kistna. His executive officer on the Kistna was Lieutenant Commander Mahendra Nath Mulla. Kistna and Beas called on Tanga and participated in the celebrations of Tanganyika National Union Day. Thereafter, for a short stint, he also commanded the Naval air station INS Garuda at Cochin.

After a two-year stint, in 1965, Kuruvila was appointed commanding officer of INS Circars, the boys' training establishment in Visakhapatnam. In early 1967, he attended the National Defence College as part of the 7th course. After the course, in December that year, he took over as the fifth commanding officer of the Navy's flagship - the aircraft carrier . He commanded the Vikrant for two full years, till December 1969. After handing over command to Captain Kirpal Singh, he moved to Naval Headquarters. He was promoted to the rank of Commodore and officiated as the Chief of Personnel (COP) at Naval HQ. As the COP, he also served as the President of the Services Sport Control Board.

Flag Rank
In August 1970, Kuruvila was appointed the next Commander of the Western Fleet. In October, he was promoted to the rank of Rear Admiral and took over as the third Flag Officer Commanding Western Fleet (FOCWF) from Rear Admiral V. A. Kamath. As the FOCWF, Kuruvila flew his flag on his old ship, the Vikrant. On 26 January 1971, he was awarded the Ati Vishisht Seva Medal for distinguished service of an exceptional order.

Indo-Pakistani War of 1971

The Indo-Pakistani War of 1971 was sparked by the Bangladesh Liberation war, a conflict between the traditionally dominant West Pakistanis and the majority East Pakistanis. In 1970, East Pakistanis demanded autonomy for the state, but the Pakistani government failed to satisfy these demands and, in early 1971, a demand for secession took root in East Pakistan. In March, the Pakistan Armed Forces launched a fierce campaign to curb the secessionists, the latter including soldiers and police from East Pakistan. Thousands of East Pakistanis died, and nearly ten million refugees fled to West Bengal, an adjacent Indian state. In April, India decided to assist in the formation of the new nation of Bangladesh.

With this, the Eastern Fleet came into being. The Mysore, commanded by Captain R K S Ghandhi, became the flagship of the Western Fleet on which Kuruvila flew his flag. He argued in favour of using the Vidyut-class missile boats offensively. He suggested that taking the missile boats in tow with the Fleet would "decisively tilt the scales in any encounter between the opposing Fleets." He even wrote to the Flag Officer Commanding-in-Chief (FOC-in-C) Western Naval Command Vice Admiral Surendra Nath Kohli in a proposal stating:

"I have no doubt whatsoever that the correct utilisation of the missile boats is to use them offensively, two at a time, in company with the Fleet. If I have these boats with me at sea, as your Fleet Commander I can guarantee total victory once contact has been made with enemy surface units, regard less of his superiority in speed and gun power".

ORBAT
The Order of Battle of the Western Fleet under Kuruvila was:
Fleet Commander: Rear Admiral Elinjikal Chandy Kuruvila, PVSM, AVSM
 Flag Ship INS Mysore - Captain R K S Gandhi, VrC
 15th Frigate Squadron
 INS Trishul - Captain K M V Nair, VrC 
 INS Talwar - Commander S S Kumar, VrC
 14th Frigate Squadron
 INS Khukri - Captain Mahendra Nath Mulla, MVC
 INS Kirpan - Commander R R Sood, VrC, NM
 INS Kuthar - Commander U C Tripathi, NM
 31 Patrol Squadron
 INS Kiltan - Commander K P Gopal Rao, MVC, VSM
 INS Katchall - Commander K N Zadu, VrC
 INS Kadmatt - Commander S Jain, NM
Frigates
 INS Cauvery - Commander I K Erry
 INS Kistna - Commander R A J Anderson
 INS Tir - Commander M Pratap
Destroyer
 INS Ranjit - Commander R N Singh
Submarines
 INS Karanj - Commander Vijai Singh Shekhawat, VrC
 INS Kursura - Commander Arun Auditto, NM
OSA Class Patrol Boats
25 K Squadron - Commander Babru Bhan Yadav, MVC
251K Division
 INS Nashak - Lieutenant Commander R B Suri
 INS Nipat - Lieutenant Commander B N Kavina, VrC
 INS Nirghat - Lieutenant Commander J Sharma, AVSM, VrC
 INS Nirbhik - Lieutenant Commander S Issac
252 K Division
 INS Vijeta - Commander A K Parti
 INS Vinash - Lieutenant Commander V Jerath, VrC
 INS Veer - Lieutenant Commander O P Mehta, VrC, NM
 INS Vidyut - Lieutenant Commander B B Singh

Operation Trident & Operation Python

On 4 December, the fleet successfully executed Operation Trident, a devastating attack on the Pakistan Naval Headquarters at Karachi that sank a minesweeper, a destroyer and an ammunition supply ship. The attack also irreparably damaged another destroyer and oil storage tanks at the Karachi port. To commemorate this, 4 December is celebrated as the Navy Day. This was followed by Operation Python on 8 December 1971, further deprecating the Pakistan Navy's capabilities.

For his command of the Western Fleet during the war, Kuruvila was awarded the Param Vishisht Seva Medal (PVSM) on 26 January 1972. The citation for the PVSM reads as follows:

Post-war career
Kuruvila continued to lead the Western Fleet after the war. In May 1972, he led two ships of the fleet - the flagship Mysore flying his flag and the Leopard-class frigate  to a goodwill visit to ports in the gulf. The ships called on Muscat, Abu Dhabi, Bahrain
and Kuwait.

In March 1973, he was appointed Flag Officer Commanding Southern Naval Area (FOCSOUTH). He took over as the second FOCSOUTH from Rear Admiral V A Kamath. This was a short stint, as he was appointed Chairman and Managing Director (CMD) of the Mazagon Dock Limited (MDL) in Mumbai. During his stint as CMD of MDL, he was promoted to the rank of Vice Admiral. Kuruvila retired from the Navy on 1 March 1976.

Personal life and later life
Kuruvila married Pinky and the couple had two daughters - Pria and Laila. After Pinky's death in 1982, Kuruvila married Priya. The Kuruvilas moved to Ooty after his retirement. He served as the President of the Ootacamund Club from 1987 to 1990. He died in Ooty in March 1994.

References

Bibliography

Indian Navy admirals
Royal Indian Navy officers
Chiefs of Personnel (India)
Flag Officers Commanding Western Fleet
Recipients of the Param Vishisht Seva Medal
Recipients of the Ati Vishisht Seva Medal
Graduates of the Royal Naval College, Greenwich
National Defence College, India alumni